The International School of Temple Arts (ISTA) is an organization which facilitates workshops and tribal gatherings and according to its statement these are related to the field of sexual shamanism, sexual healing and integrative attitudes towards mind, body, emotions, sexuality and shadow work.

ISTA was founded in 2007 by Baba Dez Nichols as an international non-profit educational organization. Baba Dez Nichols stars in the award-winning documentary Sex Magic. The film according to Amazon: "When his lifestyle of multiple lovers is shaken by the loss of his true love, Maya, Dez must practice what he preaches. Can he channel her return through a tantric ritual he calls Sex Magic?" 

Initially, ISTA had a central office and manager, but trainings are now worldwide, and there is no longer an operational location. Instead, a "Governance Circle" of trainers oversees the organization. The Governance Circle consists of five ISTA faculty members who make decisions about allocation of financial resources, and whatever governance issues may arise. After having served a few years on the Governance Circle, the ISTA faculty members generally retire to join the "Wisdom Circle", making themselves available for consultation when needed. Nichols is no longer involved in the trainings, and stepped-down from his participation in the Governance Circle in 2019.

Tantra and shamanism influence ISTA teachings. Nudity and other practices believed to occur at ISTA have caused controversy around ISTA trainings at some locations. Sexual practices can occur in connection with ISTA events, but sexual education about safe sex practices are a core component of ISTA trainings. "Safe Sex" not only means safe from sexually transmitted infection, but safe from emotional abuse, safe from relationship endangerment, safe from misunderstood intentions, and a feeling of safety that boundaries will be respected.

Although ISTA began in Arizona, it has expanded, such that many thousands of individuals have taken the ISTA trainings all over the world. In Israel, a large community of ISTA graduates have developed and created other programs that are carrying the ISTA teachings to a larger audience. Such organizations include 'Alma' and 'Ishtar'.

Training levels
ISTA holds four main programs: 
Level 1 (SSSEx, Spriritual Sexual Shamanic Experience) is a week-long experience for the integration of spirituality and sexuality. 
Level 2 (SSSIn, Spriritual Sexual Shamanic Initiation) is a deeper initiation journey, working more with shadow aspects and the transpersonal self. 
Level 3 (SSSeed, Spriritual Sexual Shamanic Seeding) is designed to train people who want to work in the field of sexual shamanism either within ISTA or autonomously. 
The Practitioner Training is a structured program for developing practitioners to offer this work one on one.

Controversy
In 2022, an article in the Israel-based 'Haaretz' newspaper shared allegations of issues involving potential power dynamic and boundary issues present in groups representing the sacred sexuality community. In this article former ISTA facilitator Ohad Pele Ezrahi was mentioned specifically:

"The complainant is Rachel, a young American woman who participated in a Level 2 workshop that Pele facilitated in Arizona, a little over a year ago.

In a post, which she calls "an open letter to Ista", and later in a conversation with "Haaretz", she describes how it gradually became clear to her that Pele himself takes part in the exercises as an ordinary participant, while at the same time not giving up the position of the powerful teacher/facilitator. "During one of the exercises, Ohad told me explicitly that he wanted to touch my breasts and vagina," she says. "I was shocked, but I felt safe, because it was an exercise without touch”. A few days later, when she was randomly partnered with him and was instructed to do an exercise that involved touching, "he approached me and I felt a surge of strong sexual energy on his part. At that moment I froze. I felt like I couldn't think straight or to express myself". He asked her what her boundaries were, she only managed to answer "without penetration", and within a short period of time he rolled down her panties in front of everyone, repeated his question, and while she managed to mutter  “only around”, he raised her pelvis to his lips and touched her "around". "I was very surprised, I didn't plan to take them off," she writes. And yet, it turned out that all this caused great displeasure in the facilitator. "These are not your boundaries! I'm sick of your spiritual bullshit. Next time be here," he scolded her, she said. "I remember feeling hurt and disgusted.I felt like I had just been violated at that moment. Today I also see it as manipulation."

In a New Zealand Herald article from October 2022 another woman made similar claims of power dynamic abuse against Ohad Ezrahi, stating that, "He (Ezrahi) asked what her boundaries were and she told him “no penetration” - but then without warning, she says he pulled down her underwear and started performing oral sex on her."

Some of the head faculty of ISTA intended to facilitate the "Love From The Ashes" retreat in Auschwitz concentration camp, where group sexual-shamanic rituals were intended to be performed in and near the death camp in order to "dive with dark love into this painful point on the planet, and bring love from the ashes." Although the event was described as a “sexual shamanic journey,” ISTA's public relations person claimed it was about love and not sex.  In January 2023, ISTA released a statement that this "was not an ISTA official event, though we can understand some confusion as it was briefly featured on ISTA’s webpage and the creators and facilitators of the event were ISTA faculty."

A 2022 article on 'Only Sky' explored reports of power dynamic issues between organizers and participants in ISTA events.

News articles published in 2022 and 2023 suggest ISTA may be a high pressure group with power dynamic issues impacting participants.

Physical temple
ISTA creates temporary temples in its workshops, that happen in different venues. It is also associated with a permanent physical temple located in New Zealand near Palmerston North. Formerly  Manor Estate, ISTA Wisdom Council member Bruce Lyon converted the hotel into Highden Temple. Highden has its own six week temple trainings as well as being a venue for ISTA programs.

Publications
  This an anthology of autobiographical stories from ISTA faculty.

See also 
 Neotantra
 OneTaste
 Stan Dale
 Tantra
 Rajneesh

References

External links
 
 [ Highden Temple website]
 
 
 
 ISTA Faculty and Governance
 ISTA Podcast
 

Human sexuality organizations
International non-profit organizations
Intimate relationships
New religious movements
Organizations established in 2013
Sexual misconduct allegations